Lawrence of Březová (around 1370 – around 1437) was a Czech writer of Hussite period, author of Carmen insignis Corone Bohemie and Historia Hussitica. He wrote in Czech and Latin. He was a historian of the Hussite movement. His works are usually regarded as more or less reliable.

Life
Lawrence was born in Březová, today a part of Úmonín near Kutná Hora. Date of birth, and death are not known exactly (date of birth around 1370, last documented day of his life is 6 July 1437.) He was a lower nobelman. He studied at Prague University where he gained his bachelor's degree in 1389 and master's degree in 1394. In 1391, he was ordained by Pope Boniface IX, at an uncanonical age of twenty, and consequently on 17 May 1391 pope assigned him to the parish of Louny. In the nineties of the 14th he started his service at the side of the king Wenceslaus IV of Bohemia (probably until his death in 1419). He was also a supporter of the Hussites. He was an opponent of Sigismund Korybut and therefore forced to leave Prague in 1427. Around that year he translated the Prague Nové Město privilegia, which were abolished in 1434. During the request for the reinstitution of the emperor (1436) these privileges were reinstated thanks to the testimony of Vavřinec.

Work
 Song about the victory in Domažlice(modern name), original Carmen insignis Coronae Bohemiae pro tropheo sibi divinitus concesso circa Ryzmberg et Domazlic, a Latin poem about the Battle of Domažlice, which happened on 14 August, 1431 and during which a part of participants of the 4th Crusade allegedly fled before they have even the Hussite army. 
 Historia Hussitica – Latin chronicle about the Hussite movement, author is writing from the perspective of Prague Hussites. He wrote against Sigismund, Holy Roman Emperor but also against the radical Hussites. The unfinished chronicle depicts the period between the years 1414 and 1422, the biggest importance is given to the period 1419–142. This politically and factographically comprehensive work is the longest source for knowledge about the early phase of the Hussite movement and one of the most significant literary works of the Hussite movement.

He was also a translator, his translations are usually deemed of high quality. He translated mostly during the time when he worked in the court, where he e.g. translated the so-called Travels of Sir John Mandeville. Authorship of so-called Budyšínský rukopis is wrongly attributed to him.  He also translated Somniarium Slaidae from Latin, which itself was itself a translation of an eight-century Arabic treatise by Muhamed ben Sirin.

Sources
 Marcela K. Perett, Preachers, Partisans, and Rebellious Religion, Chapter 7. Writing History to Shape the Future: Historia Hussitica by Lawrence of Březová and Historia Bohemica by Aeneas Silvius Piccolomini, pp. 192–214 
 Josephus Emler, Fontes rerum bohemicarum: Prameny dějin českých, Volume 5, Prague, 1893, pp. XX (Introduction), pp. 327–563 (Hussite Chronicle and the Carmen insignis) 
 Thiago de Aguiar &  Davi da Silva, (2016), A CRÔNICA HUSSITA DE VAVŘINEC Z BŘEZOVÉ E SUA AUTOIMAGEM NACIONALISTA TCHECA. Revista de história. 381–405. 10.11606/issn.2316-9141.rh.2015.115379.

Studies
 Krýchová, Petra, Žena v očích Vavřince z Březové (Woman in eyes Vavřinec z Březové) 
 Dana Martínková ,Příspěvek k jazykové charakteristice latinských spisů Vavřince z Březové, in Listy filologické / Folia philologica Roč. 105, Čís. 4 (1982), pp. 228–232

References

1370s births
1430s deaths
People from Kutná Hora District
People from the Kingdom of Bohemia
14th-century Bohemian writers
15th-century Bohemian writers
15th-century translators